Manningham railway station was a railway station in Manningham, near Bradford, West Yorkshire, England between 1868 and 1965.

History
It became the first stop out of Bradford on the Midland Railway (originally the Leeds and Bradford Railway), built in 1846. The Midland became part of the LMS in 1923, and British Railways in 1948.

Manningham station opened on 17 February 1868. It was located north of the bridge of Queens Road (A6177 road) across the railway line.

From 1872, there was an extensive network of sidings and sheds, known as Manningham motive power depot, to the north of the station.

The station was closed following the Beeching Axe on 20 March 1965; unlike the next station on the line, Frizinghall, it has not reopened.

In the 1950s, and up to closure in 1965, the Bradford Railway Circle used a hut on the platform at Manningham station for its meetings.

Stationmasters
In 1908 the station was placed under the supervision of the stationmaster at Bradford for a period of time.

George Patrick ca. 1879 - 1901 
David Bennett Smith 1901 - 1908 (formerly station master at Gargrave, afterwards station master at Keighley)
Robert Little 1926 - 1933  (also station master at Frizinghall, afterwards station master at Tutbury)
Thomas Hagley 1933 - 1939. (formerly station master at Menston, also station master at Frizinghall)
John Fell 1939 - 1945 (also station master at Frizinghall)
F.W. Garnett 1945  - (also station master at Frizinghall)

Possible re-opening

The map on the back of 'Canal Road News', Issue 1 (March 2006), published by the canal Road Business Forum, marks 'Potential Manningham Station' on approximately the site of the original station. However, this map (and the whole publication) is mainly about the proposed rebuilding of the Bradford Canal, and there is no mention of Manningham Station in the text.

In January 2008, it was revealed that the City of Bradford prepared a bid to the Regional Transport Board for £10 million, which, combined with the £10 million the council received from the sale of Leeds Bradford Airport would provide funding for the reopening of Manningham station, as well as a number of other road infrastructure projects in the Aire Valley.

Connections

References

 Bairstow, Martin 2004 Railways Through Airedale & Wharfedale. 
 Whitaker, Alan & Brian Myland 1993 Railway Memories No. 4: Bradford Bellcode books.

External links
 Manningham station on navigable 1947 O. S. map

Disused railway stations in Bradford
Former Midland Railway stations
Railway stations in Great Britain opened in 1868
Railway stations in Great Britain closed in 1965
1868 establishments in England
1965 disestablishments in England
Beeching closures in England
Manningham, Bradford